Peter Bayliss (27 June 1922 – 29 July 2002) was an English actor. Bayliss was born in Kingston upon Thames and trained at the Italia Conti Academy and the John Gielgud Company. More than six feet tall, with a voice to match, he supplemented it with a barrage of wheezings, croakings, mutterings and, as the opera singer in Frontiers of Farce (Old Vic, 1977), garglings. In 1956 he appeared on stage in "The Matchmaker" at the Royale Theatre in New York and in 1960 he appeared in "Ross" at the Royal Haymarket Theatre in London. His 20 films ranged from The Red Shoes (1948) to Darling (1965). He acted in more than 40 television productions including Please Sir! (he played the part of Mr Dunstable, Dennis Dunstable's father), The Sweeney, Coronation Street, Lovejoy and The Bill, plus dramas like Bye, Bye Columbus (1990), Merlin (1998) and The Arabian Nights (1999). On radio he was particularly good in Jacobean adaptations, playing characters with names such as Sir Moth-Interest and Walter Whorehound. He appeared in more than 100 theatre productions. He made several films for the Children's Film Unit in his later years.

Selected filmography
Caesar and Cleopatra (1945) - Aide to Mithridates (uncredited)
The Red Shoes (1948) - Evans - Lord Oldham's Chauffuer (uncredited)
The Frightened Man (1952) - Bilton
Jet Storm (1959) - Bentley
From Russia with Love (1963) - Commissar Benz
Darling (1965) - Lord Grant
The Spy with a Cold Nose (1966) - Professor (uncredited)
Pretty Polly (1967) - Critch
30 Is a Dangerous Age, Cynthia (1968) - Victor
House of Cards (1968) - Edmond Rosier
Lock Up Your Daughters (1969) - Mr. Justice Squeezum
Arthur? Arthur! (1969) - Dr. Hubble
The Magic Christian (1969) - Pompous Toff
Please Sir! (1971) - Mr. Dunstable
Vampira (1974) - Maltravers
Mr. Selkie (1979) - Mr. Selkie
Bullshot (1983) - Chairman of the Institute
Mister Skeeter (1984) - title role
School for Vandals (1986) - Sir Oswald Kane
Hard Road (1988) - Hitch-Hiker
Emily's Ghost (1992) - Rev. Dodsworth
Don't Get Me Started (1994) - Father (voice, uncredited)
The Ugly Duckling (1997) - The Actor Manager (voice)
Merlin (1998) - 2nd Physician
Alice in Wonderland (1999) - Mr. Dodo
 Midsomer Murders  (1999) - Tramp

References

External links

1922 births
2002 deaths
Alumni of the Italia Conti Academy of Theatre Arts
English male film actors
English male stage actors
English male television actors
People from Kingston upon Thames